Wacky is another word for eccentric behavior, sometimes in an amusing manner.

Wacky and similar may also refer to:

Wacky Bennett (1900-1979), the nickname of Canadian politician W. A. C. Bennett
Mr Wacky (1964-2005), Jamaican dancehall performer also known as Bolge
WAQY, a Springfield, Massachusetts FM radio station once known as "Wacky 102"
WAYE, a Birmingham, Alabama AM radio station formerly known as "Wacky 1220" (as WAQY)

See also
Wackies, an American independent record label
"Captain Wacky", a nickname for Paul Keating (born 1944), former Prime Minister of Australia
Wacko (disambiguation)